Drunk History is an American educational comedy television series produced by Comedy Central, based on the Funny or Die web series created by Derek Waters and Jeremy Konner in 2007. They with Will Ferrell and Adam McKay are the show's executive producers. In each episode, an inebriated narrator, joined by host Waters, struggles to recount an event from history, while actors enact the narrator's anecdotes and also lip sync the dialogue. In addition to Waters and celebrity guest stars, the show's characters are played by regulars such as Bennie Arthur, Tim Baltz, Mort Burke, Sarah Burns, Maria Blasucci, Craig Cackowski, Michael Cassady, Michael Coleman, Tymberlee Hill, Adam Nee, Jeremy J. Tutson, Greg Tuculescu, J.T. Palmer and Aasha Davis.

The series premiered on Comedy Central on July 9, 2013. On August 26, 2019, the series was renewed for a seventh season. On August 19, 2020, that decision was reversed when Comedy Central cancelled the series, with the sixth season serving as its last. Early production had already begun before production halted due to the COVID-19 pandemic. A number of international versions have also been produced.

Production
The idea for the series originated from a drunken conversation that Derek Waters had with his friend actor Jake Johnson in which Johnson recounted the story of R&B singer Otis Redding, who died in a plane crash. Waters thought it would be funny to film and recreate a story of an intoxicated person stumbling through a historical story, and have actors reenact the story. Waters told his friend, actor Michael Cera, about the idea, and Cera encouraged him to make it and volunteered to appear in the video. The first video premiered on the website Funny or Die on August 6, 2007. It starred Johnson, Waters, Cera, and actress Ashley Johnson. The series continued to air online on Funny or Die and briefly aired on HBO. It premiered on Comedy Central on July 9, 2013.

The storytellers in the series read up on the stories while sober, then rehearse it in front of a producer before getting drunk. Waters says he drinks with the storytellers in order to "let them know we're doing this together" and so as not to make it feel exploitative.

Accuracy
According to Derek Waters, all the dates and story elements are true, though the historical figures' dialogue is obviously not accurate. He told NPR that he "make[s] sure to go back and say: Make sure you say this date or this person's name. I don't want to mess up anyone's names. But obviously the dialogue is the stuff that is not accurate." Independent newspapers have verified that the information in the series is historically accurate.

Episodes

International versions
Since January 12, 2015, a British version of Drunk History has been broadcast on Comedy Central's UK channel. A Latin American version, Drunk History: El lado borroso de la historia, is presented by Eugenio Derbez. The Hungarian version, Tömény történelem, premiered on October 24, 2016? on Comedy Central Hungary. A Brazilian version hosted by Danilo Gentili, Drunk History Brasil: o Lado Embriagado da História, aired on SBT as a segment of The Noite com Danilo Gentili in 2017. Comedy Central Brasil broadcast the show separated from The Noite. Argentina's Telefe (owned by Viacom) will broadcast the Argentine version of the show, Pasado de Copas: Drunk History, hosted by Marcos Mundstock, a member of Les Luthiers. Polish version, Drunk History: Pół litra historii, premiered on October 12, 2017 on Comedy Central Poland.

An Australian version entitled Drunk History Australia was commissioned for Network Ten’s Pilot Week in 2018, in which a 30-minute pilot episode aired along with several other new show pilots. The episode featured stories about Ned Kelly and Phar Lap and was presented by Stephen Curry & Rhys Darby. A season was commissioned in October 2019 by Network Ten and was released prematurely on 27 March 2020 on their streaming service, 10 Play, prior to its official premiere on 14 September 2020.

Reception
The first season of Drunk History received mixed reviews from critics. On Rotten Tomatoes, it holds an approval rating of 61% and an average score of 6.4/10, based on 18 ratings. The site's critics consensus reads: "Drunk Historys boozy lectures wear out their welcome fast and the bevy of comedic talent is wasted on cheesy pantomimes, but audiences who enjoy a fresh spin on historical retellings may want to take a swig." On Metacritic, the season has a weighted average score of 57 out of 100, based on 14 critics, indicating "mixed or average reviews".

Accolades

References

External links
 

2010s American sketch comedy television series
2013 American television series debuts
2019 American television series endings
Adult education television series
Comedy Central original programming
English-language television shows
Television series featuring reenactments
Television series based on Internet-based works
Storytelling television shows
Television series by Funny or Die
Television series by Gary Sanchez Productions
Fiction with unreliable narrators
American educational television series
Television productions cancelled due to the COVID-19 pandemic